Events from the year 2023 in the British Virgin Islands.

Incumbents

Governor: John Rankin
Premier: Natalio Wheatley

Events

January
10 January - Former Speaker of the House of Assembly, Julian Willock, is reportedly arrested and then released in relation to suspicions of human trafficking.  Through a statement released on an affiliated news website, Willock strenuously denied the allegations, and referred to them as "unfounded". Willock had previously resigned as speaker under pressure from his party in May 2022.

See also
2023 in the Caribbean

Footnotes

 
2020s in the British Virgin Islands
British Virgin Islands